Alex Moffat (born 1982) is an American actor and cast member on Saturday Night Live

Alex or Alexander Moffat may refer to:

Alex Moffat (American football) (1862–1914), American football player, coach and official
Alex Moffat (trade unionist) (1904–1967), Scottish trade unionist
Alex Moffat (rugby union) (born 1968), English rugby union player
Alexander Moffat (born 1943), Scottish painter
Alexander Moffat (physicist) (died 1936), Scottish minister and physicist in India

See also
Alec Moffatt (1879–1960), Australian rules footballer